Barbara Pope may refer to:

 Barbara Corrado Pope (born 1941), novelist and historian
 Barbara E. Pope (1854–1908), African-American teacher, writer and activist
 Barbara S. Pope (born 1951), United States Assistant Secretary of the Navy